Micropentila mamfe, the Ghana dots, is a butterfly in the family Lycaenidae. It is found in Ivory Coast and Ghana. The habitat consists of primary forests.

References

Butterflies described in 1986
Poritiinae